The 2014–15 season was FC Lokomotiv Gorna Oryahovitsa's returning season for the club  in professional football after 10-years pause.

First-team squad

  15/0

  14/0
   14/2
  14/0
 10/1
   13/0
  10/0
  14/1
  13/4
  2/0

  14/0

  15/7
 1/0
  12/1
  15/4
   8/1
   1/0
   14/14

Fixtures

League

League standings

Bulgarian Cup

First round

1/8-finals

First leg

Second leg

1/4-finals

First leg

Second leg

References

External links

FC Lokomotiv Gorna Oryahovitsa seasons
Lokomotiv Gorna Oryahovitsa